AAA refers to Authentication (to prove identity), Authorization (to give permission) and Accounting (to log an audit trail).

It is a framework used to control and track access within a computer network.

Common network protocols providing this functionality include TACACS+, RADIUS, and Diameter.

Usage of AAA in Diameter (protocol) 

In some cases, the term AAA has been used to refer to protocol-specific information. For example, Diameter uses the URI scheme AAA, which stands for Authentication, Authorization and Accounting, and the Diameter-based Protocol AAAS, which stands for Authentication, Authorization and Accounting with Secure Transport. These protocols were defined by the Internet Engineering Task Force in RFC 6733 and are intended to provide an Authentication, Authorization, and Accounting (AAA) framework for applications, such as network access or IP mobility in both local and roaming situations.

While the term AAA has been used in such a narrow context, the concept of AAA is more widely used within the industry. As a result, it is incorrect to refer to AAA and Diameter as being one and the same.

Usage of AAA servers in CDMA networks

AAA servers in CDMA data networks are entities that provide Internet Protocol (IP) functionality to support the functions of authentication, authorization and accounting. The AAA server in the CDMA wireless data network architecture is similar to the HLR in the CDMA wireless voice network architecture.

Types of AAA servers include the following:
Access Network AAA (AN-AAA): Communicates with the RNC in the Access Network (AN) to enable authentication and authorization functions to be performed at the AN. The interface between AN and AN-AAA is known as the A12 interface.
Broker AAA (B-AAA): Acts as an intermediary to proxy AAA traffic between roaming partner networks (i.e., between the H-AAA server in the home network and V-AAA server in the serving network). B-AAA servers are used in CRX networks to enable CRX providers to offer billing settlement functions.
Home AAA (H-AAA): The AAA server in the roamer's home network. The H-AAA is similar to the HLR in voice. The H-AAA stores user profile information, responds to authentication requests, and collects accounting information.
Visited AAA (V-AAA): The AAA server in the visited network from which a roamer is receiving service. The V-AAA in the serving network communicates with the H-AAA in a roamer's home network. Authentication requests and accounting information are forwarded by the V-AAA to the H-AAA, either directly or through a B-AAA.

Current AAA servers communicate using the RADIUS protocol. As such, TIA specifications refer to AAA servers as RADIUS servers. However, future AAA servers are expected to use a successor protocol to RADIUS known as Diameter. 

The behavior of AAA servers (radius servers) in the CDMA2000 wireless IP network is specified in TIA-835.

See also
Layer 8 
Cyberoam
Computer access control

References

Code division multiple access
Computer security procedures